Thomas Coster Scott (September 3, 1930 – August 31, 2015) was an American football linebacker and defensive end in the National Football League for the Philadelphia Eagles and the New York Giants. He played college football at the University of Virginia, where he was an All-American as an offensive and defensive end. He was inducted into the College Football Hall of Fame in 1979. Scott was also an elite lacrosse player and was Virginia's first two-sport All-American. He was also on the U.Va. baseball and basketball squads.

Scott died on August 31, 2015.

References

1930 births
2015 deaths
American football defensive ends
American football linebackers
New York Giants players
Philadelphia Eagles players
Virginia Cavaliers football players
Virginia Cavaliers baseball players
Virginia Cavaliers men's basketball players
Virginia Cavaliers men's lacrosse players
Eastern Conference Pro Bowl players
College Football Hall of Fame inductees
People from Towson, Maryland
Players of American football from Baltimore
Sportspeople from Baltimore County, Maryland
American men's basketball players